The 1990 Colorado State Rams football team represented Colorado State University in the Western Athletic Conference during the 1990 NCAA Division I-A football season. In their second season under head coach Earle Bruce, the Rams compiled a 9–4 record.

Schedule

Roster

References

Colorado State
Colorado State Rams football seasons
Colorado State Rams football
Freedom Bowl champion seasons